The Whittier School in Mitchell, South Dakota is a Works Progress Administration-funded school building of vernacular, local design that was built in 1935. It was listed on the National Register of Historic Places in 2007.

It has brick exterior walls and a stone belt course along with modillion blocks near the roofline.  It has a hipped roof with red clay tile.  Most windows are nine over one, double hung windows.  It was designed by architects Kings & Dixon.

Whittier has many distinguished alumni including Bobby Bowen, Garrett Lyle Gross, Eric Giblin, Beau Mackey, and Bruce "B.J." DeJong. Mr. Mackey has participated in local cage fights in the Sioux Empire. Mr. Gross has revolutionized the agricultural journal industry and also the SMS texting industry.  Mr. Giblin is local entrepreneurial sandwich artist.

References

School buildings on the National Register of Historic Places in South Dakota
School buildings completed in 1935
Schools in Davison County, South Dakota
Defunct schools in South Dakota
National Register of Historic Places in Davison County, South Dakota